Andrei Sepci (7 October 1911 – 3 December 1992) is a Romanian former footballer and manager. He was the manager that guided Știința Cluj in its successful 1964–65 Cupa României campaign.

International career
Andrei Sepci played four games at international level for Romania, including three clean sheets in the successful 1933 Balkan Cup.

Honours

Player
Universitatea Cluj
Divizia A runner-up: 1932–33
Cupa României runner-up: 1933–34
Romania
Balkan Cup: 1933

Manager
Universitatea Cluj
Cupa României: 1964–65

References

External links
 Andrei Sepci managerial stats

1911 births
1992 deaths
Romanian footballers
Romania international footballers
Association football goalkeepers
Liga I players
Liga II players
FC Universitatea Cluj players
Victoria Cluj players
Romanian football managers
FC Universitatea Cluj managers
FC Petrolul Ploiești managers
FCM Bacău managers
CSM Jiul Petroșani managers